Salahuddin Khan Mehsud  is a Grade 22 Pakistani police officer who is currently serving as the Commandant FC. He is the former Inspector-general of police of Azad Kashmir and served there from March 2019 to June 2021. He previously served as the Inspector General of Police of Khyber Pakhtunkhwa from March 2017 till February 2019. Khan also served in CID,Intelligence Bureau(IB),traffic police, frontier reserve police and the Counter-Terrorism Force for over two years. Khan is native of South Waziristan agency.

References

Pakistani police officers
Living people
IGPs of Khyber Pakhtunkhwa Police
Year of birth missing (living people)